Chudomir Grigorov (born 18 March 1989) is a Bulgarian former professional footballer who  played as a defender for Botev Plovdiv, Spartak Plovdiv and Chavdar Etropole. He is now a personal fitness trainer.

Football career
Born in Plovdiv, Grigorov was educated to football in Botev's youth academies. He made his debut for the first team on June 15, 2009, in the 0:3 loss against Lokomotiv Plovdiv in the Eternal derby of Plovdiv.

Trivia
Chudomir Grigorov's nickname is "The Wonder", which comes from his first name.

References

Bulgarian footballers
1989 births
Living people
Association football defenders
Botev Plovdiv players
FC Spartak Plovdiv players
FC Chavdar Etropole players
First Professional Football League (Bulgaria) players
Footballers from Plovdiv